was a town located in Funai District, Kyoto Prefecture, Japan.

As of 2003, the town had an estimated population of 6,090 and a density of 49.31 persons per km². The total area was 123.50 km².

On January 1, 2006, Hiyoshi, along with the towns of Sonobe and Yagi (all from Funai District), and the town of Miyama (from Kitakuwada District), was merged to create the city of Nantan.

External links
 Official website of Nantan 

Dissolved municipalities of Kyoto Prefecture
Populated places disestablished in 2006
2006 disestablishments in Japan
Nantan, Kyoto